Cuddington is the name of several places in the United Kingdom:

Cuddington, Buckinghamshire, a village and civil parish
Cuddington, Eddisbury, near Northwich, Cheshire, a village and civil parish
Cuddington, Malpas, a civil parish near Malpas, Cheshire, containing the village of Cuddington Heath
Cuddington, a former name of Kiddington, Oxfordshire
Cuddington, Surrey, a village demolished to make room for Henry VIII's Nonsuch Palace

See also
Coddington (disambiguation)